Wuzhou Changzhoudao Airport  was an airport serving the city of Wuzhou in Guangxi Zhuang Autonomous Region, China. On 23 January 2019, the new Wuzhou Xijiang Airport was opened on to replace Changzhoudao Airport.

See also
List of airports in China
List of the busiest airports in China

References

Airports in Guangxi
Wuzhou
Defunct airports in China
2019 disestablishments in China
Airports disestablished in 2019